A penumbral lunar eclipse took place on Thursday, March 3, 1988, the first of two lunar eclipses in 1988, the second being on August 27, 1988. Earlier sources compute this as a 0.3% partial eclipse lasting under 14 minutes, and newest calculations list it as a penumbral eclipse that never enters the umbral shadow. In a rare total penumbral eclipse, the entire Moon was partially shaded by the Earth (though none of it was in complete shadow), and the shading across the Moon should have been quite visible at maximum eclipse. The penumbral phase lasted for 4 hours, 53 minutes and 50.6 seconds in all, though for most of it, the eclipse was extremely difficult or impossible to see. The Moon was 2.2 days after apogee (Apogee on Tuesday, March 1, 1988), making it 6.1% smaller than average.

This was a relatively rare total penumbral lunar eclipse with the moon passing entirely within the penumbral shadow without entering the darker umbral shadow.

The tables below contain detailed predictions and additional information on the Penumbral Lunar Eclipse of 3 March 1988. 

Penumbral Magnitude: 1.09076

Umbral Magnitude: -0.00163

Gamma: 0.98855

Saros Series: 113th (62 of 71)

Date: 3 March 1988

Greatest Eclipse: 03 Mar 1988 16:12:45.7 UTC (16:13:41.5 TD)

Ecliptic Opposition: 03 Mar 1988 16:01:03.9 UTC (16:01:59.8 TD)

Equatorial Opposition: 03 Mar 1988 15:09:41.3 UTC (15:10:37.2 TD)

Visibility 
The total penumbral lunar eclipse was visible over Europe, Africa, Asia, Australia, northwestern North America, seen rising over the 30th meridian east and setting over the 150th meridian west on the Equator.

Relations to other lunar eclipses

Eclipses of 1988 
 A penumbral lunar eclipse on March 3.
 A total solar eclipse on March 18.
 A partial lunar eclipse on August 27.
 An annular solar eclipse on September 11.

Saros series 
This eclipse is part of Saros cycle series 113.

Lunar year series

Metonic series

Half-Saros cycle
A lunar eclipse will be preceded and followed by solar eclipses by 9 years and 5.5 days (a half saros). This lunar eclipse is related to two total solar eclipses of Solar Saros 120.

See also 
List of lunar eclipses
List of 20th-century lunar eclipses

Notes

External links 
 

1988-03
1988-03
1988 in science
March 1988 events